The 2009–10 season was the 88th season of competitive association football and sixth season in the Football Conference played by York City Football Club, a professional football club based in York, North Yorkshire, England. Their 17th-place finish in 2008–09 meant it was their sixth successive season in the Conference Premier. The season covers the period from 1 July 2009 to 30 June 2010.

Martin Foyle made 11 signings before the summer transfer window closed, ahead of his first full season as manager. York set a new saw a new record for consecutive league wins, with eight from 14 November 2009 to 23 January 2010. They finished fifth in the table, and after beating Luton Town 2–0 on aggregate in the play-off semi-final, they lost 3–1 to Oxford United in the final at Wembley Stadium. York were eliminated from the 2009–10 FA Trophy in the fourth round by Barrow, and from the 2009–10 FA Cup in the third round by Stoke City.

25 players made at least one appearance in nationally organised first-team competition, and there were 17 different goalscorers. Defender James Meredith missed only one of the 57 competitive matches played over the season. Richard Brodie finished as leading goalscorer with 34 goals, of which 26 came in league competition, four came in the FA Cup, three came in the FA Trophy and one came in the play-offs. The winner of the Clubman of the Year award, voted for by the club's supporters, was Michael Ingham.

Background and pre-season

Colin Walker was dismissed as manager of York City early into the 2008–09 season, and his successor was former Port Vale manager Martin Foyle. The team finished the season in 17th-place in the Conference Premier table, and were defeated 2–0 by Stevenage Borough in the 2009 FA Trophy Final at Wembley Stadium. Mark Greaves, Steven Hogg, Daniel McBreen, Shaun Pejic, Josh Radcliffe, Mark Robinson, Simon Rusk, Liam Shepherd and Christian Smith and Ben Wilkinson were released by York after the season ended. Adam Boyes, Craig Farrell, Darren Kelly and Onome Sodje left for Scunthorpe United, Rushden & Diamonds, Portadown and Barnsley respectively.

Richard Brodie, Andy McWilliams, Josh Mimms and Ben Purkiss signed new contracts with York. 11 players joined before the season kicked off; defenders James Meredith from Shrewsbury Town, Alan O'Hare from Mansfield Town and Djoumin Sangaré from Salisbury City, midfielders Neil Barrett from Ebbsfleet United, Andy Ferrell from Kidderminster Harriers, Alex Lawless from Forest Green Rovers, Levi Mackin from Wrexham, winger Craig Nelthorpe from Oxford United, and strikers Michael Gash from Ebbsfleet, Richard Pacquette from Maidenhead United and Michael Rankine from Rushden. Striker Michael Emmerson was promoted from the youth team after he signed a professional contract with the club. Daniel Parslow was named as captain for the season, having taken over the role during 2008–09.

York retained the previous season's home kit, which comprised red and navy blue halved shirts with red collars, navy blue shorts and navy blue socks with two white strips on the cuffs. A new away kit was introduced, and it included light blue shirts with white horizontal stripes, light blue shorts and light blue socks. There was a change in shirt sponsor, with the name of Pryers Solicitors becoming present on the team kits.

Review

August
York's season started with a 2–1 away defeat by Oxford, in which Brodie gave York the lead before Oxford scored two late goals. This was followed by a 0–0 home draw with Rushden, in which Rankine had a goal ruled out, as the referee had awarded a foul against Rushden. York's first win of the season came with a 2–0 home victory over Forest Green, and the goals were scored by Rankine and Adam Smith. Emmerson joined Northern League Division One club Billingham Town on a one-month loan. A second defeat of the season came after Gareth Taylor scored for Wrexham in a 1–0 away defeat. Pacquette scored the equalising goal for York in a 1–1 away draw with Hayes & Yeading United after being introduced as a substitute. The team's first away victory came with a 2–1 win against Gateshead, with goals from Brodie and Gash. Goals from Brodie (2) and Smith ensured a second successive victory of the season, after beating Histon 3–1.

September

Goals in the opening 10 minutes from Brodie and Gash gave York a 2–0 home win over Crawley Town. A 0–0 draw away to Barrow followed, who had been beaten 6–1 by Rushden & Diamonds in their previous match. Two goals from Brodie, both of which were assisted by Sangaré, gave York 2–0 victory at home to Kettering Town. Simon Russell was loaned out to divisional rivals Tamworth, having failed to play any matches for York up to that point in 2009–10. Gash scored a header on 89 minutes to secure a 2–2 home draw with Cambridge United, after having given York the lead in the first half, before Cambridge scored two goals through Jai Reason and Mark Beesley. Goals from Brodie (2) and Gash gave York a 3–2 victory over Kidderminster. Chris Carruthers was signed from Oxford on a one-month loan to provide competition with Ferrell and Meredith on the left-hand side, while O'Hare was loaned out to Conference North club Gainsborough Trinity.

October
Sangaré scored a goal in stoppage time to earn York a 1–1 home draw against Stevenage, who had taken the lead through a Parslow own goal. York beat Tamworth 3–2 away, which was the opposition's first home defeat in 2009–10, with goals from Ferrell, Brodie and Sangaré. The team's 10-match unbeaten run came to an end following a 1–0 away defeat by Salisbury, who scored with a penalty in the second-minute. Boyes rejoined the club on loan from Scunthorpe as cover for the injured Gash ahead of a 1–1 home draw with Oxford, who equalised after York had taken the lead through Rankine. Barrett gave them the lead away to Luton Town, before the home team equalised through Asa Hall, the match finishing a 1–1 draw. York played Bedworth United in the FA Cup fourth qualifying round, and a 2–0 home win was secured with goals from Rankine and Brodie. They were beaten 3–1 away by Crawley, after Brodie had given York the lead in the first half.

November

Carruthers' loan was extended until January 2010, and after Sangaré picked up an injury, Mansfield defender Luke Graham joined on a one-month loan. York beat League Two team Crewe Alexandra 3–2 in the FA Cup first round, with goals from Brodie and Pacquette. Nelthorpe was loaned to fellow Conference Premier club Barrow until January 2010, having struggled to establish himself in the team. Kevin Gall, a striker released by Darlington, was signed ahead of the match against Chester City, which York won 3–2 after Brodie scored a hat-trick. Former Grays Athletic winger Tyrone Berry was signed on non-contract terms, having impressed on trial. Rankine scored the only goal in a 1–0 home win over Ebbsfleet. He followed this up with the winning goal after scoring a header in a 1–0 away victory over AFC Wimbledon. Lawless scored the only goal in a 1–0 victory at home to Gateshead, with a low shot from Gash's headed assist. Cambridge were beaten 2–1 away in the second round of the FA Cup; Rankine and Brodie scored in the first half, which meant York reached the third round for the first time since 2001–02. Foyle and Brodie respectively were named as the Conference Premier Manager and Player of the Month for November 2009.

December
Brodie scored the only goal in a 1–0 away victory over Rushden. Mansfield agreed to extend Graham's loan until January 2010, when he would sign for the club permanently. Goals from Carruthers and Brodie gave York a 2–1 home win over Wrexham, a result that equalled the club record for successive victories in all competitions with eight. Youth-team defender Dean Lisles was promoted to the first-team squad, to provide cover for the injured Sangaré, O'Hare and Purkiss. York drew 0–0 away to Hinckley United in the first round of the FA Trophy, and the replay at home was won 3–1, in which Brodie scored his second hat-trick of 2009–10. York beat fellow play-off contenders Mansfield 3–0 on Boxing Day, Brodie (2) and Gash scoring. Berry was released after failing to make an appearance, while Emmerson was loaned out to Ossett Town of the Northern Premier League Premier Division.

January

York were defeated 3–1 away by Premier League team Stoke City in the FA Cup third round, after they had taken the lead when Barrett scored a header from a Lawless free kick. Carruthers and Graham signed for the club permanently, with the former signing for 18 months and the latter until the end of the season. York beat Hayes & Yeading 4–1 at home, with Carruthers, Brodie (2) and Gall scoring. A 0–0 away draw with Newport County of the Conference South meant York would have a replay in the FA Trophy second round. Midfielder Courtney Pitt joined on loan from Cambridge for the rest of the season and Russell moved the other way, while Nelthorpe was loaned out to Luton and Gall extended his contract to the end of the season. Barrett scored the only goal with a shot from outside the penalty area to give York a 1–0 win away to Cambridge. York won their FA Trophy second round replay against Newport 1–0 at home, Pacquette scoring the winning goal in stoppage time. O'Hare returned to Gainsborough on loan for the rest of the season. York beat Conference North team Corby Town 1–0 at home in the FA Trophy third round, the winning goal coming from a penalty scored by Ferrell.

February
Emmerson was released by the club after failing to make any first-team appearances, while Ferrell joined Gateshead for a £3,500 fee and Jamie Clarke signed having been released by Grimsby Town. Purkiss gave York the lead away to Histon before Bradley Hudson-Odoi scored to equalise as the match finished a 1–1 draw, which ended a club record run of league victories at nine. A 1–0 away win over Kettering came after Rankine scored the only goal with a volley from inside the penalty area. Goalkeeper Simon Miotto joined the club as goalkeeping coach, and later registered as a player. York suffered their first league defeat since October 2009 after being beaten 1–0 away to Ebbsfleet; Brodie was sent off in this match, for which he received a three-match suspension. This was followed by a 0–0 draw at home to fellow play-off contenders Luton. York suffered their first home defeat in 10 months after being beaten 1–0 by Eastbourne Borough.

March
A 2–1 away defeat to Barrow saw the team knocked out of the FA Trophy in the quarter-final, Pacquette scoring for York. York suffered a second straight league defeat after being beaten 2–1 away by Forest Green Rovers, in which Mackin scored after his shot hit the back of an opposition player. Chester's expulsion from the Football Conference resulted in York having the three points gained against them from a 3–2 victory expunged, meaning the team moved down to sixth in the table. York were defeated 2–1 at home by Salisbury, after Sangaré had put the team in the lead. Chesterfield midfielder Paul Harsley joined on loan until the end of the season, and made his debut in a 0–0 draw away to Altrincham, a result that ended a run of three consecutive defeats. York's first victory in six league matches was a 1–0 away win over Mansfield, Pitt scoring his first goal for the club. McWilliams was loaned out to Northern Premier League Premier Division club Whitby Town for one month. A second successive victory came after Barrett scored the only goal in a 1–0 away victory over Kidderminster. Graham opened the scoring in a 1–1 home draw with Tamworth, who equalised through former York player Chris Smith. A 4–0 victory away to Grays saw Brodie score for the first time since January 2010 with two goals; Harsley and Barrett also scored.

April and May

York beat Altrincham 2–1 at home after going behind to a Chris Denham goal, before McGurk scored the equaliser and Brodie scored the winning goal with a stoppage time penalty. This was followed by a 5–0 home win over AFC Wimbledon, Rankine scoring goals in each half and Brodie scoring a first half hat-trick. A seven-match unbeaten run came to an end when York were beaten 3–1 away by Eastbourne, conceding three goals in the first 32 minutes before Rankine scored a penalty to finish the scoring. York's place in the play-offs was secured after a 3–0 home win over Barrow, with goals from Brodie (2) and Gash. Before the home match against Grays, Ingham was presented as the 2009–10 Clubman of the Year, voted for by the club's supporters. The match finished a 1–1 draw, Brodie giving York the lead before Duran Reynolds equalised for Grays on 89 minutes.

The team completed their league programme with a 1–0 defeat away to champions Stevenage. York finished in fifth place in the Conference Premier table, which meant they would play Luton in the play-off semi-final. Brodie scored on 90 minutes to give York a 1–0 home win first leg. York won the second leg 1–0 away with a Carruthers goal, meaning the tie ended 2–0 on aggregate. Following the match, the squad were forced to leave Kenilworth Road through the back of a stand after having missiles thrown at them by a section of Luton fans. The team lost the play-off final 3–1 to Oxford at Wembley, in which York scored from an own goal conceded by goalkeeper Ryan Clarke.

Summary and aftermath
York spent most of the season in a play-off place, and rose as high as second in February 2010, while they were as low as 17th in August 2009. Their defensive record of 35 goals conceded was the third-best in the division, while their record of two home league defeats was the joint second-best. Meredith made the highest number of appearances during the season, appearing in 56 of York's 57 matches. Brodie was York's top scorer in the league and in all competitions, with 26 league goals and 34 in total. Rankine was the only other player to reach double figures, with 10 goals.

York released Clarke, Gall, Mimms, Nelthorpe, O'Hare and Pacquette at the end of the season, while Graham, Purkiss, Russell and Smith left for Kettering, Oxford, Cambridge and Mansfield respectively. Mackin and Sangaré signed new contracts. York's summer signings were goalkeeper David Knight on a season-long loan from Histon, defenders Duane Courtney from Kidderminster and Greg Young from Altrincham, midfielder Jonathan Smith from Forest Green, wingers David McDermott from Kidderminster and Peter Till from and Walsall, and striker George Purcell from Braintree Town. York handed professional contracts to two youth-team players, winger Jamie Hopcutt and Lisles.

Match details

Conference Premier

League table (part)

FA Cup

FA Trophy

Conference Premier play-offs

Transfers

In

 Brackets around club names denote the player's contract with that club had expired before he joined York.

Out

 Brackets around club names denote the player joined that club after his York contract expired.

Loans in

Loans out

Appearances and goals
Source:

Numbers in parentheses denote appearances as substitute.
Players with names struck through and marked  left the club during the playing season.
Players with names in italics and marked * were on loan from another club for the whole of their season with York.
Players listed with no appearances have been in the matchday squad but only as unused substitutes.
Key to positions: GK – Goalkeeper; DF – Defender; MF – Midfielder; FW – Forward

See also
List of York City F.C. seasons

References

York City F.C. seasons
York City
Foot